Paul Neumann (13 June 1875 in Vienna – 9 February 1932) was an Austrian swimmer and physician, who competed at the 1896 Summer Olympics in Athens and became the first ever Austrian gold medalist.

Biography
Neumann was Jewish, and born in Vienna. Neumann was first noticed for his swimming when in 1892 he won the Austrian National River Championship, two years later he won the 500 metres at the Austrian Championships. In 1896 Neumann travelled to Athens and competed in 1896 Summer Olympics, all three swimming events were on the same day, so with Alfréd Hajós, from Hungary withdrawing from the 500 metre freestyle race because he needed time to recover after winning the 100 metres, there were only three competitors for the 500 metres, which Neumann won in a time of 8:12.6 minutes nearly two minutes faster than his rivals. Neumann also entered the 1200 metre freestyle which was straight after his victory which is why he didn't finish the race.

He immigrated to the U.S. after the 1896 Olympic Games. There, he became a physician, and earned a Ph.D. in philosophy.

In 1897 while competing for the Chicago Athletics Association he set world records at 2, 3, 4, and 5 miles and in the same year he won the American and Canadian Freestyle Swimming Championships.

In 1984, Neumann was inducted into the International Jewish Sports Hall of Fame, and two years later he was inducted into the International Swimming Hall of Fame.

See also
 List of members of the International Swimming Hall of Fame
List of select Jewish swimmers

References

External links

Profile with picture

1875 births
1932 deaths
Swimmers at the 1896 Summer Olympics
19th-century sportsmen
Olympic swimmers of Austria
Olympic gold medalists for Austria
Austro-Hungarian Jews
Jewish swimmers
Swimmers from Vienna
Austro-Hungarian emigrants to the United States
Jewish Austrian sportspeople
Medalists at the 1896 Summer Olympics
Austrian male freestyle swimmers
Olympic gold medalists in swimming